The D.H. Anderson Building, also known as the Sue's Hallmark Store, was a historic building located in Maquoketa, Iowa, United States. The three-story brick building was built in 1882 by Dr. Galloway Truax, a local druggist. The grocery firm of D. H. Anderson initially occupied the first-floor commercial space, and Anderson bought the building in 1888. It remained in the family until 1956. A lawyer and the Knights of Pythias occupied the second floor, and the Masons occupied the third floor. The building had an unusual gable roof to accommodate the Masons' desire for a vaulted ceiling. After the Masons moved out in 1902, the Knights of Pythias occupied the third floor until 1957. Various retail establishments occupied the first-floor retail space. The building was damaged in a 1971 fire. It was listed on the National Register of Historic Places in 1986.

The building was destroyed in a massive fire on January 19, 2008, that also destroyed four other buildings with a sixth severely damaged. The Mitchell-Maskrey Mill across the alley was also damaged.

References

Commercial buildings completed in 1882
Buildings and structures in Maquoketa, Iowa
National Register of Historic Places in Jackson County, Iowa
Commercial buildings on the National Register of Historic Places in Iowa
Italianate architecture in Iowa
Burned buildings and structures in the United States